Kiribati participated at the 2018 Summer Youth Olympics in Buenos Aires, Argentina from 6 October to 18 October 2018.

Athletics

Kiribati was given a quota for a female sprinter, Darina McDermott.

Rowing

Kiribati qualified one boat based on its performance at the Oceania Youth Olympic Games Qualification event.

 Boys' single sculls - 1 athlete, Martin Tamoaieta.

Weightlifting

Kiribati was given a quota by the tripartite committee to compete in weightlifting, but the KNOC did not select an athlete from Kiribati.

  Boys' events - 1 quota  (not used)

References

You
Nations at the 2018 Summer Youth Olympics
Kiribati at the Youth Olympics